Sione Tuipulotu (born 2 December 1997) is a Tongan rugby union player, who currently plays as a lock or loose forward for  in New Zealand's domestic National Provincial Championship competition and  in Super Rugby.

Tuipulotu played for both Samoa and Tonga's Under 20 sides, while also being called up to the New Zealand Under 20 squad.

On 27 May 2022, Tuipulotu was named in the Tongan national team for the 2022 Pacific Nations Cup and the Asia/Pacific qualification match for the 2023 Rugby World Cup. He made his international test debut for Tonga on 2 July 2022 against Fiji.

Reference list

External links
itsrugby.co.uk profile

1997 births
Living people
People educated at Wesley College, Auckland
New Zealand rugby union players
Samoan rugby union players
Tongan rugby union players
Rugby union locks
Rugby union flankers
Rugby union number eights
Moana Pasifika players
Manawatu rugby union players
Auckland rugby union players
Hawke's Bay rugby union players
Tonga international rugby union players